A Prayer for the Dying is a 1987 thriller film about a former IRA member trying to escape his past. The film was directed by Mike Hodges, and stars Mickey Rourke, Liam Neeson, Bob Hoskins, and Alan Bates. The film is based on the 1973 Jack Higgins novel of the same name.

Plot

The film begins with a small IRA team, including Martin Fallon (Mickey Rourke) and Liam Docherty (Liam Neeson), watching as two British Army Land Rovers approach the roadside bomb they have set for them. At the last minute, a school bus overtakes the army vehicles and detonates the bomb as it passes, killing the children. After most of the team escape the scene pursued by the soldiers, Fallon travels to London in a bid to escape the past. In London, he is approached by a contact who asks him to take on one last job on behalf of local gangster Jack Meehan (Alan Bates) and his brother Billy Meehan (Christopher Fulford). They offer Fallon money, a passport and passage to the US if he kills a rival gangster. Initially reluctant, he nonetheless takes on the job. However, as he is carrying out the hit in a graveyard, he is seen and confronted by the local Catholic priest, Father Michael Da Costa (Bob Hoskins). The confrontation is watched from a distance by Billy Meehan, who tells his brother there is a witness to the killing.

Fallon visits the church and confesses to the priest in a bid to ensure his silence; he also meets and finds himself becoming attracted to the priest's blind niece Anna (Sammi Davis), who lives at the church along with her uncle. Meehan, however, insists that Fallon must kill the priest too and tells Fallon he will not be paid until the loose end is tied up. Fallon now finds himself targeted by both the Meehans and the IRA, who see him as a security risk following his disappearance, and send Docherty and another member, Siobhan Donovan (Alison Doody), to London to persuade him to return to Ireland. Billy Meehan eventually decides to take matters in his own hands and goes to the church looking for Fallon, but Anna kills him in a struggle when he attacks her after finding her alone in the church house. Fallon meanwhile manages to outwit a group of Meehan's men who had been assigned to kill him after tricking him aboard a boat he was assured would be taking him to the US. Returning to the church, Fallon finds Jack Meehan with a bomb he intends to use to kill the priest and his niece but which will be blamed on Fallon and his IRA connections. After a struggle, Anna and Michael escape, but the bomb goes off killing Meehan and leaving Fallon fatally injured. In his dying moments, Fallon confesses his past to the priest, who grants him absolution. Fallon dies in peace.

Cast

Production
The novel was published in 1973. It was a moderate success though was critically well received being compared to Graham Greene. It had previously been adapted for Canadian TV in 1985 with Sean Mulcahy in the lead role.

Producer Peter Snell succeeded in raising the entire budget from Sam Goldwyn. Originally Franc Roddam was going direct A Prayer for the Dying but left during pre-production due to creative differences with Snell. "Rodham apparently wanted to make an Irish 'Rambo,' " said Alan Bates, "whereas Peter was aiming for something with far less violence and far more suspense."

"It's very Graham Greene-ish, this story," said Hodges. "And the characters are straight out of Dickens. Rat-like crooks, old London warehouses, cemeteries-and a blind girl, Anna (Sophie Ward), who is Da Costa's niece."

"The script (by Edmund Ward) that I was sent by (producer) Peter Snell was a very good adaptation of Jack Higgins' novel," Rourke said. But he was worried it would be too violent. "That is not a kind of picture I want to make in any case, and especially not the kind of picture I wanted to make after doing some research on Northern Ireland."

Rourke wanted the script to reflect Fallon's background, such as the conditions of the Irish Catholics, ("They're not unlike the conditions of the blacks in the south in America before the civil rights movement of the sixties," said Rourke) and sectarianism. "I thought that the script needed some of this information to explain why my character, Fallon, picked up a gun."

Mickey Rourke was paid £1 million to star in the film. This was part of the play or pay deal.

"He's contributed a lot of good ideas to the script," said Hodges. "He's very good in this. But then I've always liked his work. He's spent months perfecting an Irish accent. He really looks the part."

Hodges worked on the script too. "I think my main contribution was to make this killing Fallon's last," he said. "In Ireland he killed for political reasons. This last one he does for self-preservation. In the original story he went on killing people, which I thought wouldn't work for us. It made him just another hoodlum."

Originally Inseminoid music composer John Scott had composed the film but was fired due to creative differences from the producers and they hired Bill Conti to finish the score.

Tony Earnshaw recalls in his book Made in Yorkshire that another film version of the novel was planned in the 1970s to film in Leeds, the city where the original book was set, starring Lee Marvin and directed and written by Edward Dmytryk. Photos of the two men looking at Leeds locations for the film are shown in Earnshaw's book.

As part of his research for his character Mickey Rourke met some IRA members.

For the priest character, Hodges said, "Priests can be so sanctimonious on the screen, and I didn't want a Barry Fitzgerald or a Bing Crosby. I wanted him to be more a working-class priest, a rough diamond." He cast Bob Hoskins.

Alan Bates was cast as the villain.  "Only once before - in a Pinter play called One for the Road - have I played an absolute, out-and-out villain," Bates said. "There's a kind of ghastly pleasure in playing people like that - it's a side of oneself that, if it's there, one doesn't usually explore. This man in A Prayer for the Dying is so caught up in his own evil that he's lost perspective, though in a very peculiar way he has his own morality. He won't hurt old ladies, for example, and he takes genuine pride in what he does: death is an art form to him. The film is about conscience, but there's a macabre wit and a heightened sense of style in it."

Filming began in October 1986.

Editing dispute
Hodges said he delivered his cut of the film to Goldwyn in March and the company, without consulting him, re-edited it and replaced its musical score. Hodges tried to take his name off as he felt the studio had drastically altered the film.  He called it, "a piece of schlock for the American market divested of any kind of poetry or subtlety." Jack Higgins called it the best film made from one of his novels.

"They tried to use music to soften Fallon," Hodges said. "They felt he was unpleasant and unsympathetic and that they could overcome that with music. I said, `If you don't like Fallon, there is nothing you can do – with music or anything else – to make him likable.' I don't think they ever understood the character. What they have done to (the movie) makes quite certain the audience will never understand him, either."

"I don't like it; I don't like the music; it has no tension and I don't want my name associated with it," Hodges said in 1987.  "I have written to Goldwyn twice asking to have my name removed from it. I got no reply to either one. They said it was too late to take my name off the prints and all the promotional materials. But they had shown the film to others earlier. Obviously, they just didn't want to deal with my problems."

According to film producer Peter Snell, only three minutes had been cut out.

"I thought we had a deal with a handshake. I was making a small movie that I hoped would make things clearer about what's going on [in Northern Ireland]. He wanted to turn it into a big commercial extravaganza-type thing."

Goldwyn said "I won't say the experience [of making the movie] was terribly happy, but it's a good picture and he [Rourke] is very good in it."

"It isn't often a writer gets his work so accurately brought to the screen", Higgins wrote.

Reception
The film was due to open the London Film Festival on November 11, 1987 but was pulled following the IRA's Remembrance Day bombing in Enniskillen on November 8.

A Prayer for the Dying had a mixed reaction. Some liked Rourke's performance. Others put fault in his Irish accent. Other critics thought Bob Hoskins was miscast in his portrayal of the priest.

Director's cut
There were rumours that there was going to be a director's cut of the film as Mike Hodges had a critical hit film Croupier. That release was going to be by MGM. Both region 1 and 2 have the original theatrical release.

References

External links

Film 87 Mike Hodges express his dislike on the Studio cut.
 https://m.youtube.com/watch?v=1QVvecybFO4
 
 
 
 Film review (Washington Post)
 Film review (Chicago Sun-Times)

1987 films
1987 independent films
1980s thriller drama films
Political thriller films
1980s English-language films
Films scored by Bill Conti
Films based on British novels
American independent films
Films directed by Mike Hodges
Films about The Troubles (Northern Ireland)
Films about the Irish Republican Army
British drama films
British independent films
The Samuel Goldwyn Company films
1987 drama films
1980s American films
1980s British films